Blasius Mataranga was an Albanian prince of the Matranga noble family.

Life

Blasius came from the noble family Mataranga family, who were wealthy in the southern Albania coastal region between Durazzo and Valona, whose first known members were recorded in a document from the Republic of Ragusa as rulers of the territory. Temporary vassals of the Byzantine Emperors, at the beginning of the 14th century they accepted the supremacy of Philip of Taranto, who recaptured Durazzo in 1304 for the House of Anjou of the Kingdom of Naples. Between 1336 and 1343, their territory was incorporated into the expanding kingdom of  Serbs under Stefan Dušan.

After Dušan's death on December 20, 1355, Blasius Matarango established himself as a semi-autonomous prince north of Valona in the region Myzeqe (Karavasta) between the lower reaches of the rivers Shkumbin and Seman. He recognized the suzerainty of the Simeon Uroš Palaiologos, who in 1358 served him the high court dignity of a for his loyal vassal Sebastokrator, with which at the same time the legitimacy of his rule over the Albanian population was further enhanced.

Blasius Matarango died in 1367; his territories fell to the "princeps Albaniae" Karl Thopia

Literature
 Dimiter Angelov: "Imperial Ideology and Political Thought in Byzantium, 1204-1330." Cambridge University Press, Cambridge 2007, .
 John Van Antwerp Fine:  The Late Medieval Balkans: A critical Survey from the late Twelfth Century to the Ottoman Conquest.  University of Michigan Press, Ann Arbor MI 1994, .
  Constantin Jireček: “History of the Serbs.” Volume 1: “Until 1371.” Perthes, Gotha 1911 (reprinted by Adolf M. Hakkert, Amsterdam 1967), p. 415.
 Oliver Jens Schmitt:  The Venetian Albania (1392–1479)  (=  Southeast European Works.  Volume 110). Oldenbourg, Munich 2001, .

References

Albanian nobility
Year of birth missing
1367 deaths
14th-century Albanian people